Cruach Innse (857 m) is a mountain in the Grampian Mountains of Scotland. It is located south of the village of Roybridge in Lochaber.

A craggy peak, it is usually climbed in conjunction with its southern neighbour Sgùrr Innse, starting at Corriechoile Lodge on the River Spean.

References

Mountains and hills of Highland (council area)
Marilyns of Scotland
Corbetts